Apoorvam Chilar is a 1991 Indian Malayalam film, directed by Kala Adoor  and produced by Akbar. The film stars Jagathy Sreekumar, Innocent, Parvathy and KPAC Lalitha in the lead roles. The film has musical score by Johnson.

Plot
The movie revolves around a corrupt Government contractor, Pathrose who tries to gain control over everything that surrounds him. He is very afraid and feels that Jesus Christ is speaking to him. He develops enmity towards the incorruptible Shankara Warrier.

Cast
 Jagathy Sreekumar as Shankara Warrier
 Innocent as Idanilam Pathrose
 Parvathy  as Annie Pathrose
 KPAC Lalitha as Marykutty,Pathrose's wife
 Kaviyoor Ponnamma as Sarojam,Shankara Warrier's wife
 Jagadish as Subhramani
 Sai Kumar as Dr. Suresh Warrier
 Ganesh Kumar as Benny
 Oduvil Unnikrishnan as T. T. Punoose
 Ashokan as  Bobby Punnoose
 Mala Aravindan as Mathukutty, Pathrose's driver 
 Valsala Menon as Saramma
 Usha as Hema
 Mamukkoya as Rajan
 Paravoor Bharathan as Krishnan Nair
 Bobby Kottarakkara as Velappan 
 T. P. Madhavan as Chandran
 Manu Varma as Raju Pathrose

Soundtrack
The music was composed by Johnson and the lyrics were written by Kaithapram.

References

External links
 

1991 films
1990s Malayalam-language films
Films scored by Johnson